Asian food incorporates a few significant provincial cooking styles: Central Asian, East Asian, North Asian, South Asian, Southeast Asian, and West Asian. A food is a trademark way of cooking practices and customs, usually associated with a specific culture. Asia, being the largest and most populous continent, is home to many cultures, many of which have their own characteristic cuisine. Asian cuisine are also famous about their spices, Asian people traditionally use different kind of spices in their regular meals. 

Ingredients common to many cultures in the East and Southeast regions of the continent include rice, ginger, garlic, sesame seeds, chilies, dried onions, soy, and tofu. Stir frying, steaming, and deep frying are common cooking methods.

While rice is common to most Asian cuisines, different varieties are popular in the various regions. Glutinous rice is ingrained in the culture, religious tradition and national identity of Laos. Basmati rice is popular in the Indian subcontinent, jasmine rice is often found across Southeast Asia, while long-grain rice is popular in China and short-grain in Japan and Korea.

Curry is a common dish in South Asia, Southeast Asia, and East Asia. Curry dishes have their origins in the Indian subcontinent, with present-day Armenia mainly using a meat base, while those in India and Southeast Asia generally use vegetarian foundation.

History 

A heavily influential aspect of Asian culture is the food, especially the various traditional ways of Asian cuisine and cooking. Although many Asian cultures often share the traditions of bringing the family or group together to socialize or have celebrations over a meal, the various cultures of Asia each developed their own individual ethnic cultural takes on food through the interaction of history, culture, and environment.

Central Asian cuisine 

Most Central Asian nations have similar cuisines to each other as well as their neighbors, taking many features of the neighboring cuisines of Western and Eastern Asia, particularly Iran and Mongolia.  A dish known as "plov", or "osh", for example, is a widespread variation of pilaf. However, many of the same countries use horse meat and mutton as the most common meats, similar to beef. This is owing to Mongolian cuisine. In Kazakhstan and Kyrgyzstan, the cuisine has evolved to meet the needs of a nomad lifestyle.

Kumis is a widespread drink among Turkic peoples, especially in Central Asia.

Central Asia is also noted for being the birthplace of yogurt. Like kumis, it is widespread among Turkic peoples.

East Asian cuisine 

East Asian cuisine includes Chinese, Japanese, Korean, Mongolian, Taiwanese, and Tibetan food. Considering this is the most populated region of the world, it has many regional cuisines (especially in China). Examples of staple foods include rice, noodles, mung beans, soybeans, seafood (Japan has the highest per capita consumption of seafood), mutton (Mongolia), bok choy (Chinese cabbage), and tea.

North Asian cuisine

North Asian cuisine is often synonymous with Russian cuisine, due to all of Northern Asia being a part of the Russian Federation.  However, some cultures or areas of Siberia have in-depth cuisine, such as the Yakuts (or Sakha) and Yamal cuisine.  Buryats also have their own cuisine, although it is very similar to that of the related Mongolians.

Pelmeni, originally a Permic or Ugric dish, has entered into mainstream Russian cuisine as a well-known dish, but it can still be considered part of the Yamal cuisine for its area of origin.  Some speculate them to be a simplified version of the Chinese wonton.  In Siberia, pelmeni is frozen outdoors to preserve the meat inside throughout the long winter.  In Yamal, other types of drying and preservation are common.  Key ingredients in most northern Siberian cuisine include fish and cowberries, sometimes known as lingonberries in Europe and North America.  Yakuts, like many other Turkic-speaking peoples, traditionally enjoy kumis as a common drink.

South Asian cuisine 

South Asian cuisine includes cuisines from the Indian subcontinent. Food items in this region are generally rich in spices, however it also caters a blend of multi-cuisine culture from all across the world. Food is flavored with various types of chili, black pepper, cloves, condiments and other herbs and spices. Use of flavored butter and ghee is prominent in many places. Turmeric, coriander, and cumin are often used to make curries.

The multitude is inclined more towards the usage of mustard, groundnut, sunflower and soybean oil for cooking. Usage of refined oil to make pooris is quite famous.  Poori Bhaji, Idli, Dosa, Dal Baati, Litti Chokha are among the most popular and representative dishes of Indian cuisines.

Vegetables are generally eaten with a type of bread called Chapati which is the staple food of the region. Rice is generally taken with dal to moisten it in the northern parts and with curd as you move towards the southern region. 

Tea and coffee are prominent all across with the former available at every street corner. Egg dishes are also available in similar fashion.

Common meats include lamb, goat, fish, and chicken. Beef is less common than in Western cuisines because cattle have a special place in Hinduism. Prohibitions against beef extend to the meat of cows, and yaks to some extent. Pork is considered a taboo food item by all Muslims and is avoided by some Hindus. Other minorities also prohibit the use of meat to abjure violence. Fish is commonly used in South India, Sri Lanka and the Bengal region i.e. (Bangladesh and West Bengal state of India). The Northern region diet mostly include wheat,  and other major crops .

Southeast Asian cuisine 

Southeast Asian cuisine includes a strong emphasis on lightly prepared dishes with a strong aromatic component that features such flavors as citrus and herbs such as lime, coriander/cilantro and basil. Ingredients in the region contrast with the ones in the East Asian cuisines, substituting fish sauces for sauce and the inclusion of ingredients such as galangal, tamarind and lemongrass. Cooking methods include a balance of stir-frying, boiling and steaming.

West Asian cuisine 

West Asian cuisine significantly overlaps with the Middle Eastern cuisine and the inclusion of the South Caucasus.

West Asian cuisine is the cuisine of the various countries and peoples of West Asia. The cuisine of the region is diverse while having a degree of homogeneity. Some commonly used ingredients include olives and olive oil, pitas, honey, sesame seeds, dates, sumac, chickpeas, mint and parsley. Some popular dishes include kibbeh and shawarma.

Cereals constitute the basis of West Asian diet, both historically and today. Wheat and rice are the major and preferred sources of staple foods. Barley is also widely used in the region and maize has become common in some areas as well. Bread is a universal staple, eaten in one form or another by all classes and groups practically at every meal.

Butter and clarified butter (also known as Semna) are, traditionally, the preferred medium of cooking. Olive oil is prevalent in the Mediterranean coastal areas. Christians use it during Lent, when meat and dairy products are excluded, and Jews use it in place of animal fats such as butter to avoid mixing meat and dairy products.

Lamb and mutton have always been the favored meats of West Asia. Pork is prohibited in both Islam and Judaism, and as such is rarely eaten in the region. Prominent among the meat preparations are grilled meats, or kebabs. Meat and vegetable stews, served with rice, bulgur, or bread, are another form of meat preparation in the region.

Vegetables and pulses are the predominant staples of the great majority of the people in the West Asia. They are boiled, stewed, grilled, stuffed, and cooked with meat and rice. Among the green leafy vegetables, many varieties of cabbage, spinach, and chard are widely used. Root and bulb vegetables, such as onions and garlic, as well as carrots, turnips, and beets are equally common.

See also 

 List of Asian cuisines

North Asian cuisine
 Russian cuisine

East Asian cuisine
 Chinese cuisine
 Taiwanese cuisine
 Japanese cuisine
 North Korean cuisine
 South Korean cuisine
 Mongolian cuisine

South Asian cuisine
 Indian cuisine
 Pakistani cuisine
 Bangladeshi cuisine
 Nepali cuisine
 Afghan cuisine
 Bhutanese cuisine
 Sri Lankan cuisine
 Maldivian cuisine

Southeast Asian cuisine
 Thai cuisine
 Malaysian cuisine
 Singaporean cuisine
 Filipino cuisine
 Vietnamese cuisine
 Indonesian cuisine
 Cambodian cuisine
 Burmese cuisine
 Lao cuisine
 East Timorese cuisine
 Bruneian cuisine
 Christmas Island cuisine

West Asian cuisine
 Arab cuisine
 Armenian cuisine
 Assyrian cuisine
 Azerbaijani cuisine
 Bahraini cuisine
 Cypriot cuisine
 Egyptian cuisine
 Emirati cuisine
 Georgian cuisine
 Jewish cuisine
 Kuwaiti cuisine
 Lebanese cuisine
 Iranian cuisine
 Iraqi cuisine
 Israeli cuisine
 Qatari cuisine
 Omani cuisine
 Saudi Arabian cuisine
 Syrian cuisine
 Turkish cuisine
 Yemeni cuisine

Central Asian cuisine
 Kazakh cuisine
 Kyrgyz cuisine
 Tajik cuisine
 Turkmen cuisine
 Uzbek cuisine

References 

 
Cuisine
Food- and drink-related lists